The Leeds municipal elections were held on 14 May 1971, with one third of the councillors up for vote including a double vacancy in Talbot.

Reflecting national patterns, the results were a near mirror-image of the 1968 results, as Labour achieved their highest vote share since 1945, and their greatest number of votes since 1953. It was the Conservatives who sunk to a low-point this time around, setting post-war record lows in both vote percentages and actual votes. However, with the defeat being less severe and the entirety of the council not being elected this time, the Conservatives held on to control with the superior number of aldermen allotted to them the previous year. Overall turnout across the city was 37.8%.

Starting from such a shrunken base following their overwhelming defeat in 1968, Labour gained over half of seats up for election, as well as holding the seats in the four wards they won previously (City, East Hunslet, Holbeck and Middleton). Labour gained seventeen in total, with all but Castleton from the Conservatives: Armley, Beeston, Bramley, Burley, Burmantofts, Castleton, Gipton, Harehills, Kirkstall, Osmondthorpe, Richmond Hill, Scott Hall, Seacroft, Stanningley, Whinmoor, Woodhouse and Wortley. Castleton was gained from the Liberals, who repeated their success in West Hunslet for the third year running and gained from the Conservatives, leaving their total unchanged.

Election result

The result had the following consequences for the total number of seats on the Council after the elections:

Ward results

References

1971 English local elections
1971
1970s in Leeds